William Barnett may refer to:

 William Barnett (engineer) (1802–1865), British engineer
 William Barnett (Georgia politician) (1761–1832), American politician and soldier
 William Barnett (Cambridge University cricketer) (1830–1869), English cricketer
 William Barnett (MCC cricketer) (fl. 1837), English cricketer
 William Barnett, former mayor of Cadillac, Michigan
 William Barnett, fictional character on That '70s Show
 William Barnett, political candidate in Akaroa (New Zealand electorate)
 William Barnett, squatter of Bendigo in Australia
 William A. Barnett (born 1941), American economist
 William P. Barnett (born 1958), American organizational theorist
 William O. Barnett, American doctor who developed the Barnett continent intestinal reservoir procedure
 Will Barnet (1911–2012), American art historian
 Bill Barnett (born 1956), American football player